Kamila Ciba (born 29 March 1995) is a Polish sprinter who competes in international elite events. She is a silver medalist in the women's  relay at both the 2017 Summer Universiade in Taipei City and the European Team Championships in Villeneuve d'Ascq.

References

1995 births
Living people
Sportspeople from Poznań
Polish female sprinters
Universiade medalists in athletics (track and field)
Universiade silver medalists for Poland
Competitors at the 2017 Summer Universiade
Medalists at the 2017 Summer Universiade